A postscript is most often a sentence or paragraph added after the signature of a letter.

This may also refer to:
PostScript, a page description and programming language for electronic publishing
PostScript Magazine, a British student magazine
"Postscript", a song by Pet Shop Boys from the 1993 album Very
"Post Script", a song by Finch from their debut album, What It Is to Burn
P.S. (film), 2004 English film

See also
Postscripts, a British magazine